Galomecalpa suffusca is a species of moth of the family Tortricidae. It is found in Ecuador (Napo Province).

The ground colour of the forewings is cream with indistinct brownish suffusions and brown strigulation. The markings are brown, edged with cream. The hindwings are dark brown.

Etymology
The species name refers to the dark brown colour of the hindwings and is derived from Latin sufuscus (meaning dark, brownish).

References

External links

Moths described in 2006
Endemic fauna of Ecuador
Tortricidae of South America
Euliini
Taxa named by Józef Razowski